Lethaeini is a tribe of dirt-colored seed bugs in the family Rhyparochromidae. There are more than 40 genera and 180 described species in Lethaeini.

Genera
These 41 genera belong to the tribe Lethaeini:

 Adauctus Distant, 1909
 Afromydrus Scudder, 1968
 Aristaenetoides Kondorosy, 2006
 Aristaenetus Distant, 1901
 Atkinsonianus Distant, 1909
 Austroxestus Woodward, 1962
 Bubaces Distant, 1893
 Camptocera Jakovlev, 1877
 Carabocoris Gross, 1958
 Cistalia Stal, 1874
 Coleocoris Gross, 1958
 Cryphula Stal, 1874
 Diniella Bergroth, 1893
 Esuris Stal, 1874
 Exomyocara Slater & Woodward, 1974
 Gonatoides Slater, 1957
 Hexatrichocoris Kiritshenko, 1931
 Lamproceps Reuter, 1882
 Lampropunctus Scudder, 1971
 Lethaeograndellus Scudder, 1962
 Lethaeus Dallas, 1852
 Lipostemmata Berg, 1879
 Lophoraglius Wagner, 1961
 Margolethaeus Zsalakovics & Kondorosy, 2014
 Myocara Bergroth, 1916
 Neolethaeus Distant, 1909
 Neopetissius O’Donnell, 2001
 Noteolethaeus Woodward & Slater, 1962
 Orbellis Distant, 1913
 Paragonatas Barber, 1939
 Paramyocara Woodward & Malipatil, 1977
 Petissius Distant, 1893
 Porrectolethaeus Scudder, 1971
 Ptilocamptocera Wagner, 1961
 Rhaptus Stal, 1874
 Stictolethaeus O'Donnell, 1991
 Sweetolethaeus Slater, 1972
 Tuitocoris Cervantes, 2012
 Valtissius Barber, 1918
 Xestocoris Van Duzee, 1906
 † Miogonates Sailer & Carvalho, 1957

References

Further reading

External links

Rhyparochromidae
Articles created by Qbugbot